A list of films produced by the Bollywood film industry based in Mumbai in 1939:

1939
Some of the noteworthy films of 1939:

Pukar was a historical drama directed by Sohrab Modi for his own banner Minerva Movietone based on Jehangir's fair sense of justice. It was the most successful film of 1939. The film was one of the first to use spectacular sets and it was also Kamal Amrohi's first film as a scriptwriter. The film starred Chandra Mohan as Jehangir, with Naseem Banu and Sohrab Modi. 
Aadmi was a remake of the Marathi film Manoos (1939) and is regarded as a classic from Prabhat Film Company. The film starring Shahu Modak and Shanta Hublikar was a "reformist social melodrama" directed by V. Shantaram.
Dushman starring K. L. Saigal, Leela Desai and Prithviraj Kapoor was directed by Nitin Bose for New Theatres based on an idea suggested by Lady Lithgow to spread awareness of tuberculosis. The social aspect used with a romantic triangle and Saigal's songs made it a notable film.

A–B

C–F

G–J

K–M

N–R

S–Z

References

External links
 Bollywood films of 1939  at the Internet Movie Database

1939
Bollywood
Films, Bollywood